The 2008 Bank of the West Classic was a women's tennis tournament played on outdoor hard courts. It was the 37th edition of the Bank of the West Classic, and was part of the Tier II Series of the 2008 WTA Tour. It took place at the Taube Tennis Center in Stanford, California, United States, from July 14 through July 20, 2008. Aleksandra Wozniak won the singles title, the only WTA title of her career.

Finals

Singles

 Aleksandra Wozniak defeated  Marion Bartoli, 7–5, 6–3
It was Aleksandra Wozniak's 1st career title.

Doubles

 Cara Black /  Liezel Huber defeated  Elena Vesnina /  Vera Zvonareva, 6–4, 6–3

External links
 Official website
 Singles, Doubles and Qualifying Singles draws

Bank of the West Classic
2008
Bank of the West Classic
Bank of the West Classic
Bank of the West Classic